Pánfilo Eugenio Escobar Amarilla (born 7 September 1974, in Luque) is a Paraguayan football former defender who last played for River Plate. He played professionally in Paraguay, Bolivia, Colombia and Ecuador.

Career

Club
Escobar started his career in 2000 at Guaraní before playing for Sportivo Luqueño. In 2003, he was transferred to Club Nacional from Asunción where he saw limited playing time, thus he moved to Bolivian club Blooming on a loan in 2004. The following year, he returned to Nacional and played there until the end of the 2006 season. Later, he went abroad to play for Deportes Quindío in Colombia and Técnico Universitario in Ecuador. After a short stint with General Díaz of the Liga Paraguaya: Segunda División, joined in June 2011 to Club River Plate (Asunción).

International
In 2001, Escobar earned 3 caps for the Paraguay national team. He was also a member of the squad that participated in Copa América 2001.

Notes

1982 births
Living people
Paraguayan footballers
Paraguay international footballers
Association football defenders
Paraguayan Primera División players
Categoría Primera A players
Bolivian Primera División players
Sportivo Luqueño players
Club Nacional footballers
Club Guaraní players
Club Blooming players
Deportes Quindío footballers
Sportivo Trinidense footballers
River Plate (Asunción) footballers
C.D. Técnico Universitario footballers
2001 Copa América players
Expatriate footballers in Bolivia
Expatriate footballers in Colombia
Expatriate footballers in Ecuador
Paraguayan expatriates in Bolivia
Paraguayan expatriates in Colombia
Paraguayan expatriates in Ecuador
Sportspeople from Luque